Vienna Blood is a British-Austrian psychological thriller television series set in Vienna, Austria, in the 1900s. Based on the Liebermann novels by Frank Tallis, the series follows Max Liebermann (Matthew Beard), a doctor and student of Sigmund Freud, as he assists Police Detective Oskar Rheinhardt (Juergen Maurer). By providing psychological insights into the subjects’ motives, they investigate disturbing murders with success. A continuing sub-theme is the growing anti-Semitism against the Liebermann family. Max is a member of a liberal Jewish family in Leopolstadt, a traditional Jewish district, while Oskar, a lapsed Catholic, is based at that district's police precinct. 

It began broadcasting on BBC Two on 18 November 2019. On 6 July 2020, it was recommissioned for a second series. The third series began broadcasting on BBC Two on 14 December 2022.

Cast

Main
 Matthew Beard as Max Liebermann
 Juergen Maurer as Oskar Reinhardt
 Luise von Finckh as Clara Weiss
 Jessica De Gouw as Amelia Lydgate (Series 1)
 Lucy Griffiths as Amelia Lydgate (Series 2)
 Amelia Bullmore as Rachel Liebermann
 Conleth Hill as Mendel Liebermann

Recurring
 Charlene McKenna as Leah Liebermann
 Oliver Stokowski as Professor Gruner (Series 1-2)
 Raphael von Bargen as Inspector/Commissioner von Bulow
 Simon Hatzl as Police Commissioner August Strasser (Series 1-2)
 Josef Ellers as Sergeant Haussmann
 Harald Windisch as Professor Matthias (Series 1)
 Luis Aue as Daniel Liebermann (Series 1)
 Miriam Hie as Therese Lindner (Series 2-3)
 Florian Teichtmeister as Jonas Korngold (Series 2)

Guest
 Ulrich Noethen as Graf von Triebenbach
 Michael Niavarani as Herr Bieber
 Ursula Strauss as Juno Holderlein
 Johannes Krisch as Major Julius Reisinger
 Kathrin Beck as Madame Borek

Episodes

Series overview

Series 1 (2019)

Series 2 (2021)

Series 3 (2022)

Production 

The series was a co-production of Endor Productions and MR Film (Austria).

Each episode consists of two parts, but numbering of episodes varies by country. In Austria, episodes are numbered by case (3 episodes per season) but in the USA by part (6 episodes per season).

Locations 

The first series was filmed on location in Vienna and Lower Austria, beginning in October 2018. Locations included the Vienna State Opera house and Volkstheater, as well as Landstrasse Hauptstrasse, Herz Jesu church, Votivkirche, St. Charles Borromeo Church, Griechengasse, Molker Steig, Schreyvogelgasse, Dreimaderlhaus, Schonlaterngasse, Alte Schmiede, the Vienna University Archive, the Billrothhaus (Vienna 9) the Natural History Museum, the Riesenrad, Palais Pallavicini, the Burggarten park, the Stadpark, the Arsenal, Otto Wagner Hospital, Villa Mauthner von Markhof, Kirche am Steinhof, the Riesenrad (Ferris wheel), Stephansdom, Sankt-Ulrichs-Platz, Palais Pallavicini, National Library, Zentralfriedhof, Friedhof der Namenlosen, Museum of Military History, Cafe Morgenstern, Café Sperl, and Café Bräunerhof and features the Beethovenfries. In Lower Austria, the Schloss Grafenegg appears.

Series 2 was also filmed in Vienna and Lower Austria, featuring such locations as Hotel Imperial, the Stadtpark, Kursalon Hübner, Schönbrunn Palace, the Museum of Military History, Traungasse, Lagergasse, Buchfeldgasse, Florianigasse, Schulhof, Kirche am Hof, Franziskanerkirche, Michaelerkirche, Palais Collalto, Kartäuse Mauerbach (monastery) and the Franzensburg in Lower Austria.

Filming of Series 3 was split between Budapest (including the Párisi Udvar Hotel and the Vígszínház Theatre, Bedo House, Postal Museum, the National Museum of Hungary and the Hazai Bank) and Vienna (including the Loos House, Belvedere, Dr Ignaz Seipel Platz, Jesuitengasse, Michaelerplatz and the Hofburg).

Broadcast 
The first series of three 90-minute episodes was broadcast in the United Kingdom on BBC Two between 18 November and 2 December 2019. Austrian channel ORF 2 aired the show beginning 20 December 2019 with dubbing.

In the United States, PBS showed the series in six 45-minute episodes; broadcast began on 19 January 2020.

Reception
Vienna Blood received a 53% critics rating on Rotten Tomatoes, with the "Critics Consensus" reading, 'Though it rarely rises above 'watchable,' fans of period crime series may enjoy passing time with Vienna Blood's charismatic cast anyway.' The Guardian's Emine Saner, giving three out of five stars to the first episode, remarked that the series was similar to Thompson's prior work on Sherlock, particularly in its leads' dynamic and the presentation. However, she did praise the two lead actors. Sean O'Grady of The Independent gave it five out of five stars, praising the direction, recreation of the period and storytelling.

See also
 Freud (TV series), a fictive Sigmund Freud himself solves murders

References

Bibliography

  
 
 
 
 
 
 

2019 British television series debuts
2010s British crime drama television series
2010s British mystery television series
2020s British crime drama television series
2020s British mystery television series
BBC crime television shows
British detective television series
Television shows based on British novels
English-language television shows
Television shows set in Vienna